Rizwan Latif Ahmed (born October 5, 1973), also known as Rizwan Ahmed, is a Pakistani-born cricketer who played for the United Arab Emirates national cricket team. He was born in Karachi and made his debut in One Day Internationals against the Indian cricket team at the Rangiri Dambulla International Stadium.

Emirati cricketers
1973 births
Living people
United Arab Emirates One Day International cricketers
Pakistani emigrants to the United Arab Emirates
Pakistani expatriate sportspeople in the United Arab Emirates
Cricketers from Karachi